Jan Veselý (born 24 April 1990) is a Czech professional basketball player for FC Barcelona of the Spanish Liga ACB and the EuroLeague. He was selected sixth overall in the 2011 NBA draft by the Washington Wizards. Veselý is a Three-time All-EuroLeague First Team selection.

Professional career

Early years
Veselý began playing basketball with the youth clubs of Příbor and BK Snakes Ostrava in the Czech Republic. In 2007, he moved to Slovenia and signed with Geoplin Slovan.

Partizan (2008–2011)
In April 2008, he signed a multi-year deal with Serbian club Partizan. He won nine club trophies with the club, and also reached the 2009–10 Euroleague Final Four. In 2010, Veselý was presented the FIBA Europe Young Men's Player of the Year Award.

Washington Wizards (2011–2014)
Veselý was drafted in the first round by the Washington Wizards with the sixth overall pick in the 2011 NBA draft. After Flip Saunders was fired, Veselý saw more minutes on the court under new coach Randy Wittman, who also said that he wanted him to shoot the ball a bit more. On 9 April 2012, he recorded his first double-double, finishing the game with 11 points and 11 rebounds in a win over the Charlotte Bobcats. Veselý continued his success over the Bobcats on 23 April, when he posted a career-high 16 points on 8-8 shooting. He averaged 4.7 points and 4.4 rebounds in his first NBA season. However, in his second season with the Wizards, he averaged just 2.5 points and 2.4 rebounds per game and while shooting just 31% from the free-throw line.

Denver Nuggets (2014)
On 20 February 2014, Veselý was traded to the Denver Nuggets in a three-team trade. Until the end of the season, he appeared in 21 games, averaging 4.4 points, 3.7 rebounds and a career-high 1.3 steals per game.

Fenerbahçe (2014–2022)
On 5 August 2014, Veselý signed a two-year deal with the Turkish club Fenerbahçe.

Fenerbahçe advanced to the 2015 Euroleague Final Four, the first time in the team's history that they played in a EuroLeague Final Four. On 15 May 2015, however, they lost in the EuroLeague semifinal game to Real Madrid, by a score of 87–96. Veselý contributed with 20 points and 6 rebounds in the semifinal game. Eventually, Fenerbahçe finished in 4th place in the EuroLeague, after losing in the third-place game to CSKA Moscow, by a score of 80–86. Over 29 EuroLeague games played in the 2014–15 season, he averaged a career-high 11.2 points and 5.4 rebounds per game, on 63.3% shooting from the field.

He was the EuroLeague's 2015–16 season selection as the MVP for the month of January. On 21 March 2016, it was announced that he would be sidelined for up to six weeks, due to an Achilles tendon injury, which caused him to miss the entire EuroLeague playoffs against Real Madrid. He'd make his return on 13 May 2016, in the 2016 Final Four match-up against Laboral Kutxa. In his return, he'd record 14 points, in an 88–77 overtime victory against them, while also being announced as a part of the All-EuroLeague First Team, for his performances in the 2015–16 Euroleague season, before his Achilles tendon injury.

On 9 July 2016, Veselý signed a new three-year contract with Fenerbahçe, with NBA opt-out clauses every summer. In 2017, Fenerbahçe defeated Olympiakos 80-64 in the Euroleague final in Istanbul, becoming the champion for the first time in its history and Veselý became one of the most important parts of that Fenerbahçe basketball team. In May 2018, he was named the All-EuroLeague First Team for the 2017–18 season, his second career nomination. In 2017–18 EuroLeague, Fenerbahçe made it to the 2018 EuroLeague Final Four, its fourth consecutive Final Four appearance. Eventually, they lost to Real Madrid with 80–85 in the final game. Over 34 EuroLeague games, he averaged career-highs of 12.5 points and 1.6 assists, while also having 5.1 rebounds per game.

In the beginning of 2018–19 season, Veselý's game showed huge improvement in free throws shooting accuracy, as he went from one of the worst free throw shooters over years in the EuroLeague to becoming one of the leading players in that category.

On 18 February 2019, Veselý signed a three-year contract extension with Fenerbahçe. On 9 May 2019, Veselý was once again named to the All-EuroLeague First Team. Later that month, Veselý was named the EuroLeague MVP for 2018–19 EuroLeague season.

On 21 June 2022, Veselý officially parted ways with the Turkish club after eight seasons.

FC Barcelona (2022–present)
On 1 July 2022, Veselý signed a three-year deal with FC Barcelona of the Spanish Liga ACB and the EuroLeague.

National team career
Veselý has been a member of the senior men's Czech Republic national basketball team, having previously played for the Czech Republic's junior national teams. He has played at the EuroBasket 2013 and the EuroBasket 2015.

On 31 July 2021, Veselý scored 13 points in a loss to the United States men's national basketball team at the 2020 Summer Olympics in Tokyo, Japan.

Playing style
Due to his speed and court movement, Veselý has been compared to European NBA superstars Dirk Nowitzki and Andrei Kirilenko. He also considered himself to be the second coming of Blake Griffin.

Career statistics

NBA

Regular season

|-
| style="text-align:left;"|
| style="text-align:left;"|Washington
| 57 || 20 || 18.9 || .537 || .000 || .532 || 4.4 || .8 || .7 || .6 || 4.7
|-
| style="text-align:left;"|
| style="text-align:left;"|Washington
| 51 || 4 || 11.8 || .500 || .000 || .308 || 2.4 || .5 || .3 || .3 || 2.5
|-
| style="text-align:left;"|
| style="text-align:left;"|Washington
| 33 || 1 || 14.2 || .522 ||  || .267 || 3.4 || .3 || .6 || .8 || 3.2
|-
| style="text-align:left;"|
| style="text-align:left;"|Denver
| 21 || 0 || 14.6 || .506 ||  || .423 || 3.7 || .5 || 1.3 || .8 || 4.4
|- class="sortbottom"
| style="text-align:center;" colspan="2"|Career
| 162 || 25 || 15.2 || .521 || .000 || .408 || 3.5 || .6 || .7 || .5 || 3.6

EuroLeague

|-
| style="text-align:left;"|2008–09
| style="text-align:left;" rowspan="3"|Partizan
| 17 || 13 || 19.9 || .517 || .056 || .538 || 3.4 || .4 || .5 || .3 || 4.8 || 4.2
|-
| style="text-align:left;"|2009–10
| 22 || 22 || 24.8 || .550 || .400 || .625 || 4.9 || 1.4 || .7 || .5 || 8.4 || 9.5
|-
| style="text-align:left;"|2010–11
| 15 || 14 || 27.0 || .536 || .357 || .444 || 3.6 || 1.1 || 1.3 || .9 || 10.1 || 10.3
|-
| style="text-align:left;"|2014–15
| style="text-align:left;" rowspan="8"|Fenerbahçe
| 29 || 9 || 21.9 || .633 || .000 || .491 || 5.4 || .8 || .8 || 1.0 || 11.2 || 13.6
|-
| style="text-align:left;"|2015–16
| 23 || 17 || 27.4 || .623 || .667 || .453 || 6.8 || 1.6 || .8 || 1.0 || 11.9 || 15.6
|-
| style="text-align:left; background:#AFE6BA;"|2016–17
| 34 || 26 || 24.5 || .563 || .000 || .557 || 4.5 || 1.4 || 1.0 || .6 || 9.6 || 11.7
|-
| style="text-align:left;"|2017–18
| 34 || 26 || 26.6 || .609 ||  || .707 || 5.1 || 1.6 || .9 || .7 || 12.5 || 16.0
|-
| style="text-align:left;"|2018–19
| 31 || 11 || 25.1 || .651 || .200 || .787 || 4.7 || 2.4 || 1.4 || .5 || 12.3 || 17.6
|-
| style="text-align:left;"|2019–20
| 18 || 10 || 25.4 || .591 || .000 || .521 || 4.2 || 1.6 || 1.3 || .7 || 8.6 || 12.1
|-
| style="text-align:left;"|2020–21
| 31 || 31 || 28.1 || .668 || .000 || .766 || 5.3 || 2.7 || .9 || .6 || 13.1 || 18.0
|-
| style="text-align:left;"|2021–22
| 22 || 20 || 28.5 || .617 || .333 || .733 || 6.0 || 2.5 || 1.1 || .4 || 13.6 || 18.2
|- class="sortbottom"
| style="text-align:center;" colspan="2"|Career
| 276 || 199 || 25.5 || .609 || .284 || .621 || 5.0 || 1.7 || 1.0 || .6 || 10.9 || 13.9

Awards and accomplishments

Club
 Adriatic League with Partizan for 2009, 2010, 2011
  Serbian Basketball League with Partizan for 2009, 2010, 2011
  Serbian Cup with Partizan for 2009, 2010, 2011
  EuroLeague with Fenerbahçe for 2016–17
  EuroLeague Final Four with Fenerbahçe for 2015, 2016, 2017, 2018, 2019
  Turkish Basketball League with Fenerbahçe for 2015–16, 2016–17, 2017–18, 2021–22
  Turkish Cup with Fenerbahçe for 2016, 2019, 2020
  Turkish Super Cup with Fenerbahçe for 2016, 2017 

Individual
 Europe Young Men's Player of the Year with Partizan for 2010
  EuroLeague Basketball 2010–20 All-Decade Team with Fenerbahçe
  EuroLeague Season MVP with Fenerbahçe for 2018–19 
  All-EuroLeague First Team with Fenerbahçe for 2015–16, 2017–18, 2018–19 
  EuroLeague MVP of the Month with Fenerbahçe for 2015–16 January, 2018–19 December, 2020–21 January 
  EuroLeague Magic Moment of the Season with Fenerbahçe for 2017–18 with an alley-oop dunk over Brandon Davies, 2018–19 with an alley-oop dunk 
  Turkish Basketball League Finals MVP with Fenerbahçe for 2021–22
  Turkish Basketball League All-star with Fenerbahçe for 2015, 2016

Personal life
Veselý was born on 24 April 1990 in Ostrava (Czechoslovakia then, Czech Republic now). His father, Jan, is a former basketball player, and his mother a former volleyball player. Veselý's younger sister is a basketball player. Reportedly, he is fluent in Czech, Slovenian, Serbian and English.

Veselý was a favorite of the Partizan supporters. He stated he was "surprised by his popularity in Serbia, as no one in Czech Republic knew who he was". The Partizan supporters created two joke slogans, "When Jan plays, we are all joyful" (Serbian: "Kad Jan igra, svi smo veseli") and "We are all happy, only Jan is joyful" (Serbian: "Svi smo srećni, samo se Jan Veseli"), as his surname means "joyful" in both Czech and Serbian.

After the end of the 2010–11 season, which had been confirmed to be his last in Partizan, Veselý stated, "My first destination in Europe will always be Belgrade. Partizan, Belgrade and Serbia have given me a great opportunity, which now I can continue in another place. Serbia has become my second home". He also added he would like to wear number 24 once again and that his wish was to end his career in Partizan. Years of life in Serbia have left a permanent trace on his musical taste, as he said he likes Serbian music better than American or Czech music.

Veselý is a favorite of the Fenerbahçe supporters as well, with a slogan going "Jan Jan Vesely, let's fly Vesely, I can't help dunking!" (Turkish: "Jan Jan Vesely, uçalım Vesely, smacı basmadan duramıyorum!").

See also
 List of foreign basketball players in Serbia
 List of NBA drafted players from Serbia

References

External links

 Official website
 
 Jan Veselý at fiba.com
 Jan Veselý at draftexpress.com
 Jan Veselý at eurobasket.com
 Jan Veselý at euroleague.net
 Jan Veselý at tblstat.net
 
 

1990 births
Living people
ABA League players
Basketball League of Serbia players
Basketball players at the 2020 Summer Olympics
Centers (basketball)
Czech expatriate basketball people in Serbia
Czech expatriate basketball people in Slovenia
Czech expatriate basketball people in Spain
Czech expatriate basketball people in Turkey
Czech expatriate basketball people in the United States
Czech men's basketball players
Denver Nuggets players
FC Barcelona Bàsquet players
Fenerbahçe men's basketball players
KD Slovan players
KK Partizan players
Liga ACB players
Olympic basketball players of the Czech Republic
Power forwards (basketball)
Small forwards
Sportspeople from Ostrava
Washington Wizards draft picks
Washington Wizards players